Haji Sulong Abdulkadir al-Fatani, also known as Haji Sulong Tomina or Hajji Sulong, was a reformist and a separatist who disappeared in 1954. He sought greater recognition of the Jawi community in Patani. His motives for doing so were in response to General Phibun's concept of 'Thainess' in which every citizen has to subscribe to the ideology that it is the duty of a Thai to be Buddhist, speak Thai and love the monarchy. This nationalist ideology, prejudiced other ethnic groups in Thailand, like the Jawi community, and deemed the Tai ethnic groups more superior than others. Haji Sulong's request for reforms in education and public administration in southern Thailand was deemed disruptive and viewed as an act of rebellion by the central Buddhist state based in Bangkok. Till today, tensions between the central Buddhist state and the Muslim insurgents have not been quelled, and Haji Sulong's demands still stand firm and synonymous with the various insurgent groups in southern Thailand.

Early life

Formative years
Haji Sulong Abdulkadir al-Fatani was born in 1895 to a family of religious leaders. He attended Pondok Hajji Abdul Rashid in Kampung Sungei Pandang, Patani. At 12, Haji Sulong made the hajj, which was considered a luxury for most at that time. He diligently pursued his religious education, first through informal means at the grand mosque, then through secondary education which qualified him to attain formal education at a university in Egypt. While in Mecca, he had already met with many esteemed Arab religious scholars who were followers of Muhammad Abduh.

Haji Sulong was there at a time Islam, too, was undergoing a reform. With the declining power of the Ottomans, Islam needed a regime change and that came with the presence of the Young Turks. Islam had to be more progressive, assimilating and associating with secularism. Two movements broke out of this regime change. The Wahhabiyah’s  of the Saud regime pushed for the purity of Islam to be preserved by returning to the practices during the times of the prophet while the Shafi’ite schools helmed by Al-Azhar University in Egypt pushed for more modernist ideals where learning Islam should be seamless with learning secular subjects like science and mathematics. The modernist movement had a profound effect to Haji Sulong and one in which he subscribed to.

Return to Patani
Upon the death of his wife and son, Haji Sulong was at a crossroad of either continuing life in Mecca or move back to Patani. Haji Sulong had become jaded of his life in Mecca and sought to return to Patani for a short holiday. He had maintained constant contact with his family back in Patani throughout his stay in Mecca. When he decided to move back, his stay was meant to be temporary. He was highly regarded as a scholar in Mecca and had little incentive to uproot himself from the community, but when he came back to Patani, he saw a different Islam, riddled with animistic beliefs and practices. He had a desire to change that by first changing its methods of education. Dissatisfied by the standards of the pondok schools, he began teaching privately by moving around various mosques in the area; similar to his experience of informal education while in Mecca. His initiatives did not please the older generation of religious teachers as they felt he was pushing for the fundamentalistic approach of the Wahabbiyahs but he felt that it was important for him to continue his efforts in order to push for integration with the secular education. Hence, he decided to uproot from Mecca permanently; away from familiarity and security he had built over the years.

Career

Beginning of activism

One of the key reforms that Haji Sulong pushed for, was the formalization of religious education. Previously, religious education were taught at the pondok schools. These pondok schools had no established curriculum and the lessons there were taught only by the religious teacher that set it up within the various communities. Spurred by the changes that happened in Egypt, he sought to integrate religious education with the secularized subjects like science, mathematics, moral education, etc. The madrasah system received flak from the older generation of religious leaders as it veered away from the halaqah styled system of the past; which was adapted from the informal training the older generation received at masjid al-Haram. The central government was opposed to the madrasah system of education as it hinders the integration of the Jawi community with the majority Thai. The central government wanted the student to admit to the public schools which taught Thai and Buddhism alongside secular subject. The central government preferred the pondok schools as the informal school where students can attain their religious education. However, Ockey contradicts this notion as he mentioned that when Haji Sulong opened his madrasah, he invited Prime Minister Phahon after travelling to Bangkok to request for funds and that the central government would later on provide the necessary support Haji Sulong needed to open his school. Even though the central government did not fully subscribe to the alternative education at the madrasah, they were not overtly in direct opposition to the idea. Haji Sulong gained some grounds in pushing for a formalized religious education in the form of the madrasah system.

Through the Madrasa system, Haji Sulong was able to expand his influence amongst the Jawi community in Patani. The obstacles he faced while forming the madrasah too, were the key reasons that pushed Haji Sulong towards politics. He was dissatisfied with General Phibun policies of forced assimilation. He wanted some autonomy to be given to the region where Malay would be considered as an official language together with Thai and Islam be taught instead of Buddhist studies.  This opposition to the Thai identity was viewed as a form of passive resistance which later became grounds for active rebellion. Haji Sulong became increasingly involved in Thai politics as he felt the need to preserve the identity of the Jawi community amidst the central government push for a Thai identity via forced assimilation. This contradicts Thanet's view of Haji Sulong being an obstinate opposition leader. Both Liow and Ockey have positioned Haji Sulong as a matured leader who understood his intentions well. They highlighted that Haji Sulong turned separatist when negotiations with the central government broke down.

Haji Sulong's activism was met with some success. In the wake of the second World War, the uncertain policies of the British forced the Thai government to reconsider the policy of accommodation and integration of 1932. Prime Minister Pridi Banomyong even considered granting autonomy for South Thailand. One of the policies that was approved was the Patronage of Islam Act, which recognised the role and authority of the religious leaders in South Thailand. Things appeared to have improved. Subsequently, Haji Sulong was elected as the President of the Islamic committee in the Provincial Islamic Council of Patani (PICP) and his friend, Jaroen, became the mayor of Patani.

Move to politics
Troubled with the central government's involvement in his education reforms, which also led to the shutting down of his school, Haji Sulong started entering into politics. He first, managed to get alliances from the religious leaders to form a Shari’a court informally. As one of the most influential person in Patani, many politicians sought his support in order to get a strong mandate from the Jawi community. However, he showed flexibility and maturity by supporting his friend Jaroen, a Buddhist, instead of Phra Phiphit Pakdi, a Muslim. His loyalty towards his friend together with his belief for integration was more important than his ethnicity as a Jawi Muslim. However, his choice candidate was not elected due to Phra Phiphit Pakdi's cryptic use of a Quranic verse to gain support from the locals while at the same time discredited Haji Sulong. Haji Sulong's first involvement into politics was not a success but improved as time progressed.

Seven-point declaration
As the leader of the Provincial Islamic Council of Patani (PICP), Haji Sulong formulated a seven-point declaration which he felt was important in attaining some autonomy for the public administration in southern Thailand.

The seven point declaration is stated below:

1. That the four southern provinces be governed as a unit, with a Muslim governor.

2. That for the first seven years of the school curriculum, Malay be allowed as the language of instruction.

3. That all taxes collected in the four southern provinces be expended there.

4. That 85 percent of the government officials be local Malays.

5. That Malay and Thai be used together as the languages of government.

6. That the provincial Islamic committees have authority over the practice of Islam.

7. That the Islamic judicial system be separated from the provincial court system.

Haji Sulong's objectives were clear. Southern Thailand had to be governed by southern Thais and members of the Jawi community. He felt that by doing so, public administration would improve as residents of the region would understand the needs better.

Conflict with the government and Jawi community
The central government rejected Haji Sulong's demands in the seven-point declaration as they felt that the existing system was sufficient to rule the region of southern Thailand. His demands also meant that some power over southern Thailand would have to be decentralized to make way for the politicians in the region. The Jawi community, too, did not fully subscribe to Haji Sulong's ideology. They felt that Haji Sulong's demands would disturb the status quo in the region and would further outcast them from the central system of governance. As such, Haji Sulong did not receive a strong mandate for his demands.

As a result of the failures of the seven-point declaration, Haji Sulong became more agitated as his reforms draws to a standstill. He became uncompromising and urged the residents in southern Thailand to push for a no-contest in the 1948 elections. He turned towards the separatist movement led by Tengku Muhyiddin and pushed for the independence of southern Thailand. This was seen as an act of rebellion and Haji Sulong subsequently became public enemy in Thailand.

Disappearance and legacy
Haji Sulong was subsequently arrested for his involvement in stirring up the Jawi community and the actions to push for a no-contest in the region during the 1948 elections. Over the following years, he was pressured to stop his political involvement and told to report to the authorities periodically in order to ensure his obedience. His situation was seen as an insult to the Jawi community and they felt that the central government was insensitive and abusing their authority in the region. In his madrasah, the separatist ideology had managed to infiltrate in the minds of the students and the cause for independence began to grow stronger. It is not known if Haji Sulong still had a large involvement for the growing sentiments.

On 13 August 1954, Haji Sulong and his eldest son was told to report to the Songkhla Police Station along with his close associates. He was then to be transferred and face a trial in court for his involvement in the rebellion. He mysteriously disappeared on his way to the court and till this day, no one had taken responsibility of his disappearance. Over the years till the present day, stories of Haji Sulong and his push for reforms and later on independence, is something that cannot be publicly discussed and the central government is careful in navigating Haji Sulong's contributions to the history of the Muslim insurgency in southern Thailand. They fear that the stories of Haji Sulong's disappearance would rile up sentiments and increase the opposition to the central government's presence in southern Thailand. Today, Haji Sulong has achieved almost a mythical-like status for his reforms and his demands for autonomy or independence still remain relevant.

See also
List of people who disappeared

References

Bibliography

1895 births
1950s missing person cases
Enforced disappearances in Thailand
Missing person cases in Thailand
Patani
People from Pattani province
Thai activists
Thai human rights activists
Thai Muslims
Thai revolutionaries
Unsolved crimes in Thailand
Year of death unknown